Things Not Seen is a first-person novel written by Andrew Clements and his third novel after Frindle and The Landry News.  The title is apparently taken from Hebrews 11:1, "Now faith is the substance of things hoped for, the evidence of things not seen" in the King James Version of the Bible. The book was originally released in 2002 by Philomel Books, an imprint of Penguin Group, but was re-released in 2006 as a platinum edition by Puffin. The platinum edition includes a short interview with Andrew Clements and a redesigned cover.

This book was followed by two sequels, Things Hoped For and Things That Are.

Plot

Teenager Robert Phillips, known by his nickname "Bobby," wakes up one day to find that he can no longer see himself. He reveals his invisibility to his parents and is told to stay at home until his parents get back from work (his mother is an English professor, and his father a scientist). After his parents are gone, Bobby heads to the library, bundled up to conceal his invisibility. As he hurriedly leaves, he bumps into a girl, but she doesn't react when his scarf comes off. He realizes she is blind when he hands her back her cane.

Upon returning home, Bobby gets in trouble for leaving the house. His parents leave to get dinner, but Bobby later finds out from the TV that there was a major three-car crash involving his parents. The police come to the home and check on Bobby, who conceals his invisibility. Bobby goes to the hospital to see his parents, taking off his clothes so he can be invisible. He finds his Mom, who gives him money and tells him to keep his invisibility a secret.

Bobby returns to the library the next day. He goes naked this time, and stumbles upon the blind girl in a listening room. He learns that her name is Alicia, and befriends her. He eventually reveals to Alicia that he is invisible, and not tricking her because she is blind.

Bobby's journey to become visible and discover the reason for his invisibility leads him to investigate the Sears-Roebuck electric blanket he uses. He invades the Sears-Roebuck corporate headquarters and steals a list of names of people who complained to Sears-Roebuck faulty blanket. Bobby uses this list to locate Sheila Borden, whose blanket also turned her invisible a few years ago. She is completely content with being invisible, and tells Bobby never to tell anyone about her or try to cure her. Bobby tells Alicia, however. Alicia suggests that using the blanket again could reverse his problem. Bobby sleeps under the blanket and awakens to people in the house. Child protection services and the police, suspicious about Bobby's disappearance, have come searching for him. When they stare at him naked, Bobby realizes that he is visible again. His mom lies that he just came back from an extended trip. Bobby goes to tell Alicia the news, but she worries that Bobby will leave her alone now that he can go back to normal life. She ignores his instant messages before replying with an e-mail and a poem. Bobby goes over to her house to tell her he loves her.

Main characters
Alicia Van Dorn - A blind girl, also a high school student, who befriends Bobby.
Emily Phillips - Bobby's mother, a professor of English literature.
Mrs. Van Dorn - Alicia's mother. 
Robert "Bobby" Phillips- A boy that wakes up invisible and meets a kind girl named Alicia.

Dr. David Phillips - Bobby's father, a professor of physics.
Mr. Van Dorn - Alicia's father, an astronomer.
Mrs. Pagett - A social worker sent to look for Bobby after he had not been at school for many days.
Sheila Borden - Another victim of being invisible.

Awards
The book won the 2005 Middle School/Junior High California Young Reader Medal. The book won the American Library Association's 2004 Schneider Family Book Award.

See also

The Invisible Man, an 1897 novella by H. G. Wells
Memoirs of an Invisible Man, a 1988 science fiction novel by H. F. Saint
Fade, a 1988 YA novel by Robert Cormier
''Things Hoped For, sequel by Andrew Clements

External links
Andrew Clements' Official Website
Penguin Books listing
"Most teens feel invisible now and then" - a review by Courtney Williamson

References

2002 American novels
American young adult novels
Books by Andrew Clements
Fiction about invisibility
First-person narrative novels
Philomel Books books